The Étang de Diane is a coastal lagoon beside the Tyrrhenian Sea on the east coast of Haute-Corse department on the French island of Corsica.
The lagoon served as a port for the Ancient Greeks, and then for the Romans.
Today it is privately owned and mainly used for shellfish farming and fishing.

Location

The Étang de Diane is between the T10 coastal highway and the sea, just north of the village of Aléria.
It is divided between the communes of Aléria in the south and Tallone in the north.
The Tavignano river enters the sea just south of Aléria and the lagoon.
The Étang de Terrenzana is just north of the lagoon.

Physical

The Étang de Diane is separated from the sea by a marshy area and a lido (sand bar).
The lagoon has a channel to the sea running east from the north end.
The channel plays a key role in maintaining the quality of the environment and thus supporting aquaculture.

The main source of freshwater is the Ruisseau d'Arena, which enters the north end of the lagoon from the west.
The combined stream enters the lagoon near Diana Island.

It holds an estimated  of water.

The southern part of the lagoon was formed when an extensive geological movement caused a basin to form in Miocene sediments.
This accounts for the relative depth of the lagoon and its jagged shoreline.
The shallower northern part formed in the normal way for a lagoon, when a sandy lido isolated the body of water from the sea.

Ecology

According to the Ramsar Convention the lagoon is a wetland of international importance.
It is protected as a Zone naturelle d'intérêt écologique, faunistique et floristique (ZNIEFF).
It is owned by the Conservatoire du littoral.

The lagoon is not very saline, and has an interesting plant ecology.
There is luxurious Mediterranean maquis shrubland, a zone of salt-tolerant plants including samphires around the sea channel, a huge reed bed at the mouth of the Ruisseau d'Arena, and small wetlands with phragmites and rushes.
Algae grow in the lagoon when and where conditions allow.
On the banks the once predominant maquis is now a narrow belt of salicornia and inulas between the lagoon and vineyards or crops such as kiwifruit.

There are many invertebrates including the nationally protected fan mussel (Pinna nobilis).
The lagoon has 34 species of fish.
Common fish species include mullet, bass (Moronidae), sole, plaice and eel.
The fishing structures and maintenance of the sea channel support the fish nursery, and migrant fish are found throughout the lagoon.

The wetland is used by many species of rare or endangered birds for breeding or for resting while in passage.
Visitors include great cormorants, gulls, mallards and coots.
The fish attract a large population of great cormorants and laridae.
Small flocks of Eurasian wigeons use the lagoon as a resting place.
Shorebirds and large waders frequent the mudflats at the mouth of the Arena and the remote shores of the lagoon.

History

The name "Diana" is one of various place names in Corsica that indicates the long dominance of the Greeks.
Colonna de Cesari-Rocca in his 1916 Histoire de Corse says, "A few kilometers from Alalia, the Diana lagoon could shelter a commercial fleet and lend itself to the development of a war fleet. Thus a Greek Empire began to take shape in the western Mediterranean."
It seems that the Greek colonists from Phocaea came to the Étang de Diane in Corsica around the year 537 BC and from there some went on to Massala (Marseille).
Later the Phocaeans of Corsica and Massala fought together against the Carthaginians.
Ptolemy showed Dianæ portus on his maps.
The Romans later had a colony at Aleria served by the Port of Diane.

The Tour de Diane, a tower that the Genoese built at the and of the 16th century, stands at the entrance to the sea channel.
It was used to signal the approach of Barbary pirates and to protect the interior of the island.

Human activities

The Étang de Diane is not used much by the public, who usually only visit the coastal fringe.
The lagoon is privately owned by the Groupement Foncier Agricole de Diana (GFA), which leases it to companies who operate and manage it.
Three shellfish and aquaculture companies harvest oysters and mussels, sea bass, sea bream and other species.
Fishing is done with gillnets and fyke nets.
Five structures are spread over 80% of the lagoon.

The channel to the sea is managed by the Coopérative d'Utilisation de Matériel Agricole which removes sand each year to allow the waters of the lagoon to be renewed.
The lagoon does not suffer from eutrophication but lack of sanitation in some villas on the southwest edge causes microbiological problems.
There are wineries quite near the lagoon, and agriculture up to the edge of the surrounding cliffs.
Agriculture may contribute pollution of the lagoon with nitrogen, phosphorus, pesticides and heavy metals.

Notes

Citations

Sources

Lagoons of Haute-Corse